Park Joo-hyun (Hangul: 박주현; born 29 September 1984) is a South Korean football player.

Park started his professional career with Daejeon Citizen, where he scored a one goal in seven appearances. In 2009, he joined Korean Police FC in the R-League for military duty. After two years, he was discharge on expiration of term of service, and returned to Daejeon Citizen. Park joined Korea National League side Daejeon KHNP in March 2011.

External links 

1984 births
Living people
South Korean footballers
Daejeon Hana Citizen FC players
Korean Police FC (Semi-professional) players
K League 1 players
Korea National League players
Association football forwards